Leightoniella is a fungal genus in the family Pannariaceae. This is a monotypic genus, containing the single species Leightoniella zeylanensis, a cyanolichen. The genus was circumscribed in 1965 by Norwegian lichenologist Aino Henssen. The generic name honours English clergyman and botanist William Allport Leighton, who originally described the type species in 1870 as Pterygium zeylanense.

References

Peltigerales
Lichen genera
Peltigerales genera
Taxa named by Aino Henssen
Taxa described in 1965